The Day of the Kidnapping is an upcoming South Korean television series starring Yoon Kye-sang, Park Sung-hoon, Yu-na, Kim Shin-rok, Kim Sang-ho, Seo Jae-hee, and Kang Young-seok. It is based on a novel of the same title by writer Jung Hae-yeon. It is scheduled for release on ENA in the second half of 2023.

Synopsis
The series is about the collaboration of a clumsy kidnapper and a genius girl who has lost her memory.

Cast

Main
 Yoon Kye-sang as Kim Myung-joon: a clumsy and weak-minded kidnapper who planned a kidnapping to pay for his daughter's hospital bills, but is unexpectedly pursued as a murder suspect
 Oh Seung-jun as young Kim Myung-joon
 Park Sung-hoon as Park Sang-yoon: a violent crime detective
 Yu-na as Choi Ro-hee: an 11-year-old genius girl who has lost her memory
 Kim Shin-rok as Seo Hye-eun: Myung-joon's ex-wife
 Kim Sang-ho as Park Cheol-won: an employee of a security company
 Seo Jae-hee as Mo Eun-seon: a neurosurgeon
 Kang Young-seok as Jayden: a fund manager

Supporting
 Woo Ji-hyun as Choi Taek-gyun: a lawyer
 Jung Soon-won as Chae Jung-man: a detective who is the partner of Sang-yoon
 Go Ha as So Jin-yu: Ro-hee's mother
 Kim Dong-won

Production
Actress Yu-na was selected for the role of Choi Ro-hee through an audition with 500 participants.

References

External links

 

Korean-language television shows
ENA television dramas
Television series by AStory
South Korean thriller television series
South Korean mystery television series
Television shows based on South Korean novels
2023 South Korean television series debuts

Upcoming television series